Fresh is the third studio album by Canadian singer Shawn Desman. It was first released in Canada on August 3, 2010. The album was preceded by its Top 20-peaking lead single "Shiver" and the Platinum-certified dual singles "Electric" and "Night Like This".

Track listing
 "Fresh"
 "Electric"
 "Moneyshot"
 "Quickie"
 "Click"
 "Trouble"
 "Shiver"
 "Night Like This"
 "Impossible"
 "Something Stupid"
 "Dynamite"

Chart performance

Album

Singles

References

Shawn Desman albums
2010 albums